RBBS-PC (acronym for Remote Bulletin Board System for the Personal Computer) was a public domain, open-source BBS software program. It was written entirely in BASIC by a large team of people, starting with Russell Lane and then later enhanced by Tom Mack, Ken Goosens and others.

It supported messaging conferences, questionnaires, doors (through the  dropfile), and much more.

History
In 1982, Larry Jordan of the Capital PC Users Group started modifying some existing BBS software that had been ported from CP/M by Russell Lane.  The first major release of this effort, RBBS-PC CPC09, in May 1983 was written in interpreted BASIC and included the Xmodem file transfer protocol added by Jordan.  In June 1983, Jordan turned over maintenance and enhancements to Tom Mack and Ken Goosens.  The first release under Mack, version 10.0, was released July 4, 1983.  New versions and features were released steadily throughout the rest of the 1980s.  The final complete version, 17.4, was released March 22, 1992.

Since version 17.4 at least four other code paths have developed.  Some work has been done to unify the code paths and to develop version 18.0. Dan Drinnons CDOR Mods and Mapleleaf versions were further enhanced by beta testers Mike Moore and Bob Manapeli using Ken Goosens LineBled program to manipulate the source code to endless variations of the program.

Philosophy
From the beginning of RBBS-PC's development, the authors of the software had two goals as stated in the RBBS-PC documentation:
 To show what could be done with the BASIC language and that "real programmers can/do program  in BASIC."
 To open a new medium of communication where anyone with a personal computer the ability to communicate freely.  This idea was summarized as "Users helping users for free to help the free exchange of information."

References

External links
 RBBS-PC files
 The BBS Software Directory - RBBS

Bulletin board system software
DOS software
Pre–World Wide Web online services
Computer-related introductions in 1983
Public-domain software with source code